The 2022 Copa del Rey Final was a football match that decided the winner of the 2021–22 Copa del Rey, the 120th edition of Spain's primary football cup. The match was played on 23 April 2022 at the Estadio de La Cartuja in Seville between Real Betis and Valencia.

Real Betis won 5–4 on penalties following a 1–1 draw after extra time for their third Copa del Rey title.

Background
Alaska and Mario Vaquerizo delivered a musical performance before the game.

Route to the final

Key: (H) = Home; (A) = Away

Match

Summary
The match went to extra time after a 1–1 draw. After a scoreless extra time period, the match went to penalties. Real Betis left-back, Juan Miranda, scored the winning penalty. He was among the fans when Real Betis last won the competition in 2005.

Details

Notes

References

2022
Sport in Seville
21st century in Seville
2021–22 in Spanish football
2021–22 in Spanish football cups
Copa del Rey
Real Betis matches
Valencia CF matches
2020s in Andalusia
Association football penalty shoot-outs